Paweł Krzeszowiak (born 12 April 1974) is a Polish former footballer who is last known to have played as a forward for Babia Góra Sucha Beskidzka.

Career

Krzeszowiak started his career with Polish lower league side Babia Góra Sucha Beskidzka. After that, he signed for Górnik Zabrze in the Polish top flight. After that, he signed for Belgian club Beveren. In 1993, Krzeszowiak signed for German team Rot-Weiß Lüdenscheid. In 1996, he signed for GKS Tychy in the Polish top flight, where he made 11 league appearances and scored 0 goals. On 13 October 1996, Krzeszowiak debuted for GKS Tychy during a 0-2 loss to Widzew Łódź. In 2006, he signed for Polish fifth tier outfit Babia Góra Sucha Beskidzka. In 2007, he signed for Tempo Białka in the Polish seventh tier.

References

External links
 

Polish footballers
Expatriate footballers in Belgium
Association football forwards
Living people
Polish expatriate sportspeople in Germany
Ekstraklasa players
Górnik Zabrze players
Regionalliga players
Wuppertaler SV players
GKS Tychy players
Polish expatriate sportspeople in Belgium
Polish expatriate footballers
Expatriate footballers in Germany
People from Maków Podhalański
1974 births